Dorothy B. Hughes (August 10, 1904  May 6, 1993) was an American crime writer, literary critic, and historian. Hughes wrote fourteen crime and detective novels, primarily in the hardboiled and noir styles, and is best known for the novels In a Lonely Place (1947) and Ride the Pink Horse (1946).

Early life
Born Dorothy Belle Flanagan in Kansas City, Missouri, she studied journalism and after graduating from the University of Missouri with a B.J. degree in 1924 worked in that field in Missouri, New Mexico, and New York. She did graduate work in journalism at the University of New Mexico and at Columbia University without receiving degrees from either institution.

Career
Hughes's first published book, Dark Certainty (1931), a volume of poetry, won the Yale Series of Younger Poets Competition.

In 1940, she published her first mystery novel, The So Blue Marble. She published eight more mystery novels in the 1940s. She also wrote a history of the University of New Mexico and a critical study of writer Erle Stanley Gardner. In 1951 she received an Edgar Award from the Mystery Writers of America in the category of Outstanding Mystery Criticism, and in 1978 she was given the MWA's Grand Master award.

Hughes acknowledged the influence of such writers as Eric Ambler, Graham Greene, and William Faulkner. Her writing style and suspenseful plots exemplify the hardboiled genre of crime and detective novels, and her literary career associates her with other female crime writers of the 1940s and 1950s, such as Margaret Millar, Vera Caspary, Elisabeth Sanxay Holding, and Olive Higgins Prouty. In his afterword to a reissue of her last novel,  The Expendable Man (1963), Walter Mosley wrote that her fiction "captures an unease under the skin of everyday life in a way that is all her own."

Hughes was a successful writer and popular during her day. Three of her novels were made into feature films: The Fallen Sparrow (1943), starring John Garfield; In a Lonely Place (1950), directed by Nicholas Ray and starring Humphrey Bogart; and Ride the Pink Horse (1947), directed by and starring Robert Montgomery, which was remade for television in 1964 as The Hanged Man. Hughes made her home in Santa Fe, New Mexico, which she used as the setting of several novels.

From 1940 to 1979 she reviewed mysteries for The Albuquerque Tribune, the Los Angeles Times, the New York Herald-Tribune and other newspapers. Over the course of her career, she wrote a total of fourteen novels, the majority of which were published between 1940 and 1952.

Death
Hughes died on May 6, 1993, in Ashland, Oregon, from complications following a stroke.

Published books
Dark Certainty (1931) – poetry
Pueblo on the Mesa: The First Fifty Years of the University of New Mexico (1939)
The So Blue Marble (1940) – her first novel
The Cross-Eyed Bear (1940) – later published as The Cross-Eyed Bear Murders
The Bamboo Blonde (1941)
The Fallen Sparrow (1942) – filmed in 1943
The Blackbirder (1943)
The Delicate Ape (1944)
Johnnie (1944)
Dread Journey (1945)
Ride the Pink Horse (1946) – filmed in 1947; Robert Montgomery Presents TV series, "Ride the Pink Horse" episode, 1950, remade in 1964 as The Hanged Man
The Scarlet Imperial (1946) – also published as Kiss for a Killer
In a Lonely Place (1947) – filmed in 1950
The Big Barbecue (1949)
The Candy Kid (1950) – Climax TV series, "Spider Web" episode in 1958
The Davidian Report (1952) – also published as The Body on the Bench, 1952; Robert Montgomery Presents TV series, "The Davidian Report" episode, 1952
The Expendable Man (1963) – republished by Persephone Books, 2006
Erle Stanley Gardner: The Case of the Real Perry Mason (1978) – critical biography

References

Further reading
 DeAndrea, William L. (1994). Encyclopedia Mysteriosa. A Comprehensive Guide to the Art of Detection in Print, Film, Radio, and Television. New York: Macmillan.

External links 
 
 

1904 births
1993 deaths
Writers from Kansas City, Missouri
American crime fiction writers
20th-century American novelists
Edgar Award winners
Writers from Santa Fe, New Mexico
American women journalists
Yale Younger Poets winners
20th-century American women writers
20th-century American poets
American women novelists
American women poets
Women mystery writers
Novelists from Missouri
University of Missouri alumni
20th-century American non-fiction writers
American Noir writers